The 2015 TCR International Series Salzburgring round was the sixth round of the 2015 TCR International Series season. It took place on 31 May at the Salzburgring.

Kevin Gleason won the first race, starting from pole position, driving a Honda Civic Type R TCR (FK2), and Michel Nykjær gained the second one, driving a SEAT León Cup Racer.

Success Ballast
Due to the results obtained in the previous round, Gianni Morbidelli received +30 kg, Jordi Gené +20 kg and Andrea Belicchi +10 kg.

Classification

Qualifying

Notes:
 — Zsolt Szabó and Fernando Monje were moved to the back of the grid for having not set a time within the 107% limit.

Race 1

Notes:
 — Sergey Afanasyev was given a five-place grid penalty for causing a collision with Mikhail Grachev and Michel Nykjær in the Monza round.

Race 2

Standings after the event

Drivers' Championship standings

Teams' Championship standings

 Note: Only the top five positions are included for both sets of drivers' standings.

References

External links
TCR International Series official website

Salzburgring
TCR International Series, Salzburgring